Hello and Goodbye is a 1972 Soviet comedy film directed by Vitaliy Melnikov.

Plot 
The film tells about a woman who leaves her husband, having left for the city in search of the meaning of life. She meets a policeman whom she has fallen in love with and suddenly her husband returns.

Cast 
 Lyudmila Zaytseva as Aleksandra
 Oleg Efremov as Grigori Burov
 Mikhail Kononov as Mitya, Aleksandra's husband
 Aleksandr Demyanenko
 Natalya Gundareva
 Viktor Pavlov		
 Boryslav Brondukov
 Tanya Doronina
 Sasha Vedernikov
 Zhanna Blinova

References

External links 
 

1972 films
1970s Russian-language films
Soviet comedy films
1972 comedy films